The 2000–01 National Division Two was the fourteenth full season of rugby union within the third tier of the English league system currently known as National League 1. New teams to the division included West Hartlepool and Rugby Lions who were relegated from the 1999–2000 Allied Dunbar Premiership Two while promoted teams included Kendal and Esher who were promoted as champions of National Division Three North and National Division Three South respectively.  The league system was 2 points for a win and 1 point for a draw.

The league champions were Bracknell who won the title by five points and gained promotion to the 2001–02 National Division One.  They would be joined by runners up Rugby Lions (making an instant return to the division) who squeaked past Rosslyn Park despite being level on points due to a better points for/conceded record.  At the other end of the table West Hartlepool, Lydney and Camberley would be the unfortunate teams to be relegated.  West Hartlepool were easily the worse team in the division, failing to win a single game all season and suffering their second successive relegation in a row (part of a slide that would see them drop out of the national league system into regional rugby) while Lydney went down having only played 22 games due to fixture congestion/cancellations – although even if the Gloucestershire-based side won these remaining fixtures it would not have been enough to keep them up.  West Hartlepool would drop to the 2001–02 National Division Three North while Camberley and Lydney would drop to the 2001–02 National Division Three South.

Participating teams and locations

Final league table

Results

Some of the early-season scores from Rugby Statbunker are incorrect (possibly due to an automatic scoring system used on that website) as they are different from those reported in the Telegraph. I have used scores from the England Rugby website to ensure that they are accurate with reports from Statbunker primarily used to show scorers, attendances and referees were relevant.  Statbunker scores are consistent with rest of sources from 16 December 2000 onwards.

Round 1

Round 2

Round 3 

Postponed.  Game rescheduled to 3 February 2001.

Round 4

Round 5

Round 6

Round 7

Round 8 

Postponed.  Game rescheduled to 30 December 2000.

Postponed.  Game rescheduled to 30 December 2000.

Postponed.  Game rescheduled to 30 December 2000.

Postponed.  Game rescheduled to 30 December 2000.

Postponed.  Game rescheduled to 30 December 2000.

Postponed.  Game rescheduled to 30 December 2000.

Round 9 

Postponed.  Game rescheduled to 3 February 2001.

Round 10 

Postponed.  Game rescheduled to 17 February 2001.

Round 11 

Postponed.  Game rescheduled to 3 February 2001.

Round 12 

Postponed.  Game rescheduled to 3 February 2001.

Postponed.  Game rescheduled to 17 February 2001.

Round 13

Round 14 

Postponed.  Game rescheduled to 17 February 2001.

Round 15

Round 8 (rescheduled games) 

Game originally rescheduled from 4 November 2000 but postponed once again.  Game rescheduled to 3 March 2001.

Game originally rescheduled from 4 November 2000 but postponed once again.  Game rescheduled to 3 March 2001.

Game originally rescheduled from 4 November 2000 and was initially postponed once again - eventually being cancelled due to fixture congestion and the result being irrelevant to Lydney's eventual relegation.

Game originally rescheduled from 4 November 2000 but postponed once again.  Game rescheduled to 3 March 2001.

Game originally rescheduled from 4 November 2000 but postponed once again.  Game rescheduled to 3 March 2001.

Game originally rescheduled from 4 November 2000 but postponed once again.  Game rescheduled to 17 February 2001.

Round 16

Round 17

Round 18 

Postponed.  Game rescheduled to 8 April 2001.

Postponed.  Game rescheduled to 3 February 2001.

Postponed.  Game rescheduled to 7 April 2001.

Postponed.  Game rescheduled to 7 April 2001.

Postponed.  Game rescheduled to 7 April 2001.

Postponed.  Game rescheduled to 6 April 2001.

Round 19 

Postponed.  Game rescheduled to 21 April 2001.

Rounds 3, 9, 11, 12 & 18 (rescheduled games) 

Game rescheduled from 16 September 2000.

Game rescheduled from 25 November 2000.

Game rescheduled from 20 January 2001.

Game rescheduled from 2 December 2000.

Game rescheduled from 11 November 2000.

Round 20 

Postponed.  Game rescheduled to 21 April 2001.

Rounds 8, 10, 12 & 14 (rescheduled games) 

Game rescheduled from 18 November 2000.

Game rescheduled from 16 December 2000.

Game rescheduled from 30 December 2000.

Game rescheduled from 2 December 2000.

Round 21 

Postponed.  Game rescheduled to 21 April 2001.

Round 8 (rescheduled games) 

Game rescheduled from 30 December 2000.

Game rescheduled from 30 December 2000.

Game rescheduled from 30 December 2000.

Round 22 

Postponed.  Game rescheduled to 28 April 2001.

Round 23 

Game was initially postponed but would eventually be cancelled due to fixture congestion and the result being irrelevant to Lydney's eventual relegation.

Round 24

Round 25 

Game was initially postponed but would eventually be cancelled due to fixture congestion and the result being irrelevant to Lydney's eventual relegation.

Round 18 (rescheduled games) 

Game rescheduled from 20 January 2001.

Game rescheduled from 20 January 2001.

Game rescheduled from 20 January 2001.

Game rescheduled from 20 January 2001.

Game rescheduled from 20 January 2001.

Round 26 

Game was initially postponed but would eventually be cancelled due to fixture congestion and the result being irrelevant to Lydney's eventual relegation.

Rounds 19, 20 & 21 (rescheduled games) 

Game rescheduled from 27 January 2001.

Game rescheduled from 10 February 2001.

Game rescheduled from 24 February 2001.

Rounds 8 & 23 (rescheduled games) 

Game rescheduled from 4 November 2000.

Game rescheduled from 10 March 2001.

Total season attendances

Individual statistics 

 Note that points scorers includes tries as well as conversions, penalties and drop goals.

Top points scorers

Top try scorers

Season records

Team
Largest home win — 92 pts
92 - 0 Kendal at home to West Hartlepool on 27 January 2001
Largest away win — 57 pts
69 - 12 Rugby Lions away to Camberley on 21 April 2001
Most points scored — 92 pts
92 - 0 Kendal at home to West Hartlepool on 27 January 2001
Most tries in a match — 14 (x2)
Kendal at home to West Hartlepool on 27 January 2001
Esher at home to West Hartlepool on 8 April 2001
Most conversions in a match — 12
Rugby Lions away to Camberley on 21 April 2001
Most penalties in a match — 8
Lydney away to Fylde on 18 November 2000
Most drop goals in a match — 2 (x2)
Camberley at home to Nottingham on 17 February 2001
Nottingham away to Fylde on 14 April 2001

Player
Most points in a match — 42
 Mike Scott for Kendal at home to West Hartlepool on 27 January 2001
Most tries in a match — 4
 Mike Scott for Kendal at home to West Hartlepool on 27 January 2001
Most conversions in a match — 11 (x2)
 Jaques Steyn for Rugby Lions at home to Camberley on 2 December 2000
 Mike Scott for Kendal at home to West Hartlepool on 27 January 2001
Most penalties in a match —  7
 Rob Smart for Camberley away to Fylde on 9 September 2000
Most drop goals in a match —  2 (x2)
 Howard Graham for Camberley at home to Nottingham on 17 February 2001
 Tom Rolt for Nottingham away to Fylde on 14 April 2001

Attendances
Highest — 1,000 
Rosslyn Park at home to Rugby Lions on 24 February 2001
Lowest — 50 
West Hartlepool at home to Camberley on 31 March 2001
Highest Average Attendance — 650
Rosslyn Park
Lowest Average Attendance — 164	
West Hartlepool

See also
 English Rugby Union Leagues
 English rugby union system
 Rugby union in England

References

External links
 NCA Rugby

Nat
National League 1 seasons